Yuka Chokyu (born December 9, 1966) is a Canadian para-badminton player and former wheelchair tennis player who competes at international level events. She was a three-time Paralympian at the Summer Paralympics from 2000 to 2008, her highest achievement in her tennis career was where she had reached the quarterfinals at the 2000 Summer Paralympics in both the women's singles and women's doubles.

Wheelchair tennis statistics

ITF Wheelchair Tennis Tour

Singles

Doubles

Para-badminton statistics

Parapan American Games 
Women's singles

Pan Am Championships 
Women's singles

Women's doubles

References

External links

Notes

1966 births
Living people
Japanese emigrants to Canada
Canadian female badminton players
Paralympic wheelchair tennis players of Canada
Wheelchair tennis players at the 2000 Summer Paralympics
Wheelchair tennis players at the 2004 Summer Paralympics
Wheelchair tennis players at the 2008 Summer Paralympics
People from Kashiwa
Canadian para-badminton players